Revathy Kalamandhir is an Indian film production company based in Thiruvananthapuram, Kerala. It was founded in 1993 by producer G. Suresh Kumar. The company is run by Suresh Kumar and his wife actress Menaka. They have produced more than 15 films in Malayalam cinema.

History
After graduation, G. Suresh Kumar founded a film production company, Bhanumathy Films, in 1980 with its debut production being a Tamil film titled Karayae Thodathae Alaykal, directed by Ashok Kumar, written by Priyadarshan and starring Vijayan and Menaka. However, the project was shelved. In 1981, Kumar along with Sanal Kumar established the production company, Sooryodaya Creations. From Coolie (1983) to Vishnulokam (1991), eight films were produced under the banner. In 1993, Kumar founded an independent production company under the name Revathy Kalamandhir, named after his elder daughter Revathy. It is headquartered at Thiruvananthapuram, Kerala.

Filmography

Sooryodaya Creations
All productions credited to G. Suresh Kumar and Sanal Kumar.

Revathy Kalamandhir
All productions credited to Menaka, except otherwise noted.

Revathy Kalamandhir Film Academy
In 2015, Suresh Kumar established the Revathy Kalamandhir Film Academy, a film academy and post-production centre at Kinfra Film and Video Park in Kazhakoottam.

References

External links
 

Companies based in Thiruvananthapuram
Companies established in 1993
1993 establishments in Kerala
Film production companies of Kerala